Scoparia cyameuta is a moth of the family Crambidae. It was named by Edward Meyrick in 1884. Meyrick gave a description of the species in 1885. S. cyameuta is endemic to New Zealand.

The wingspan is 25–28 mm. The forewings are fuscous, irrorated with white. There is a black median streak from the base of the costa to the first line. This first line is white, margined by black on the upper half posteriorly. The second line is white, dark-margined anteriorly. The hindwings are pale whitish-ochreous. The apex and upper part of the hindmargin are narrowly grey. Adults have been recorded on wing from December to February.

References

Moths described in 1884
Moths of New Zealand
Scorparia
Endemic fauna of New Zealand
Taxa named by Edward Meyrick
Endemic moths of New Zealand